Afrasia may refer to:

 Afro-Eurasia, the landmass consisting of Africa and Eurasia
 Afrasia (primate), a fossil primate from Myanmar
 AfrAsia Bank, a Mauritius bank